Wang Jin (born 5 December 1960) is a Chinese former archer. She competed at the 1984 Summer Olympics, where she finished 18th.

References

1960 births
Living people
Chinese female archers
Archers at the 1984 Summer Olympics
Olympic archers of China
Sportspeople from Shanghai